Richard John Koubek is an American engineer and university administrator serving as the 11th president of Michigan Technological University since 2018. He formerly served as executive vice president and provost at Louisiana State University. Prior to joining LSU, Koubek was professor and head of the Harold and Inge Marcus Department of Industrial and Manufacturing Engineering at the Pennsylvania State University and he has held the posts of professor and chair for the Department of Biomedical, Industrial and Human Factors Engineering, and associate dean for research and graduate studies for the College of Engineering and Computer Science at Wright State University.

Biography 
Richard John Koubek was born in Berwyn, Illinois and spent time growing up in California's San Fernando Valley and Farmington Hills, Michigan, before returning to the Chicago area during his high school years. He received a BA from  Oral Roberts University in 1981 in biblical literature, with a minor in chemistry. He received a BS in psychology from Northeastern Illinois University in 1982, and then completed his MS and PhD in industrial engineering from Purdue in 1985 and 1987, respectively.

Koubek began his academic career as a faculty member in the Wright State University College of Engineering and Computer Science. He was named executive vice president & provost at Louisiana State University in 2015 until being named President of Michigan Technological University in 2018.

Koubek currently serves on the board of directors for the Central Collegiate Hockey Association, the Michigan Association of State Universities and InvestUP.

References

External links
Official webpage

Michigan Technological University
American academic administrators
American industrial engineers
Oral Roberts University alumni
Purdue University alumni
American engineers
Living people
Michigan Technological University faculty
Year of birth missing (living people)